Club de Fútbol Borriol is a Spanish football team based in Borriol, Province of Castellón, in the Valencian Community. Founded in 1952, it currently plays in Tercera División – Group 6, holding home games at Estadio El Palmar, which holds 1,000 spectators.

History
Chaired by the golfer Sergio García, Borriol won their first promotion to the Tercera División in June 2010. García himself played intermittently for the team from September 2010. The side slipped back into the regional leagues for one season before a return in July 2015; they had gone unbeaten in the season but lost in the play-offs to CF Cullera, who resigned their place in Tercera.

García left his post in June 2018, after another relegation.

Season to season

6 seasons in Tercera División

References

External links
Official website 
Futbolme team profile 

Football clubs in the Valencian Community
Association football clubs established in 1952
1952 establishments in Spain